Chowdhury Abraruddin Ahmed Siddiky was a member of the 3rd National Assembly of Pakistan and former member of the Baliadi Zamindar family.

Career
Siddiky was elected to the 3rd National Assembly of Pakistan from Dacca-4 in 1962.

Siddiky was a leader of the East Pakistan Film Association and East Bengal Film Association. He founded Manasi cinema hall in Dhaka in 1926. Rabindranath Tagore named the theatre. He was a member of Baliadi Zamindar family in Gazipur.

References

Si
People from Gazipur District
Bangladeshi people of Turkic descent